Ernest Meade Smythe (25 March 1904 – 9 July 1975) was an English cricketer and Indian Army officer.  His batting and bowling styles are unknown.  He was born in Ealing, Middlesex and educated at Allhallows School in Devon.

Smythe played for Devon in the 1928 Minor Counties Championship, playing three matches against the Kent Second XI, the Surrey Second XI and Cornwall.  In November 1930, he played his only first-class match for the Bengal Governor's XI against the Maharaj Kumar of Vizianagram's XI at Eden Gardens, Calcutta.  In the Bengal first-innings he scored 1 run before being dismissed by Ghulam Mohammad and in their second-innings he scored 6 runs before being dismissed by Mushtaq Ali.  With the ball he took a single wicket, that of C.R. Nayudu for the cost of 19 runs.

With the Japanese declaration of war against the British Empire during World War II, Smythe was drafted into the Indian Army as an emergency commission in February 1942, holding the rank of 2nd Lieutenant.  He died in St Columb Major, Cornwall on 9 July 1975.

References

External links
Ernest Smythe at ESPNcricinfo
Ernest Smythe at CricketArchive

1904 births
1975 deaths
People from Ealing
English cricketers
Devon cricketers
British Indian Army officers
Indian Army personnel of World War II
People educated at Allhallows College